Talianky (also spelled Tallianki, Tal'anky, Tal'ianky or Tal'ianki) is a village in Cherkasy Oblast, Ukraine, close to the city of Talne and about  south of Kyiv. It is in Talne urban hromada, one of the hromadas of Ukraine.

It is a small farming community located among large open fields that cover the plateau above the nearby Talianky River that winds its way through this area in a narrow riverine valley. 

Until 18 July 2020, Talianky belonged to Talne Raion. The raion was abolished in July 2020 as part of the administrative reform of Ukraine, which reduced the number of raions of Cherkasy Oblast to four. The area of Talne Raion was merged into Zvenyhorodka Raion.

The remains of a prehistoric settlement near the village, belonging to the Cucuteni–Trypillia culture, are the largest known in Europe during the Neolithic period.

References

Villages in Zvenyhorodka Raion